Paul Elden Kingston is an accountant and attorney who has served as the Trustee-in-Trust of the Davis County Cooperative Society (DCCS), a Mormon fundamentalist denomination, since 1987. The DCCS is a financial cooperative established by his uncle Elden Kingston in 1935. 

Kingston succeeded his father John Ortell Kingston as the Trustee-in-Trust of the DCCS upon his father's death in 1987. During his tenure, some members have continued the practice of plural, and intra-family marriage, although neither is practiced by the majority of members and the practice is not required to gain status in the group.  

Plural marriage is practiced by some members of the DCCS, and members make their own choice in who they marry. Plural marriages for individuals under 18 in the group are not allowed. For more than a decade, the group has publicly spoken out against child-bride marriages and the DCCS has a policy encouraging its members to marry within the legal age of consent.  Members generally seek the blessing of parents and religious leaders before choosing to marry. Many consider Kingston the top man in the group. 

Records show he signed as a witness on 4 lawful teenage marriages over a 20 year period. There are thousands of members in the group.

He is believed to have practiced polygamy in the past, potentially accruing as many as 40 wives and fathering up to 300 Children.

References

1959 births
American Latter Day Saint leaders
Living people
Mormon fundamentalist leaders
People from Davis County, Utah
Latter Day Saints from Utah